Nemesia can be:

 Nemesia (plant), genus of plants in the family Scrophulariaceae
 Nemesia (spider), a genus of spiders in the family Nemesiidae
 Nemesia (moth), one of many synonyms for the genus Coleophora